The women's 500 metres races of the 2015–16 ISU Speed Skating World Cup 4, arranged in the Thialf arena in Heerenveen, Netherlands, were held on 11 and 13 December 2015.

Lee Sang-hwa of South Korea won race one, while Americans Brittany Bowe and Heather Richardson-Bergsma came second and third. Yekaterina Shikhova of Russia won the first Division B race.

Yu Jing of China won race two, with Richardson-Bergsma in second place, and Yu's compatriot Zhang Hong in third. Li Huawei, also of China, won the second Division B race.

Race 1
Race one took place on Friday, 11 December, with Division B scheduled in the afternoon session, at 13:40, and Division A scheduled in the evening session, at 16:59.

Division A

Division B

Race 2
Race two took place on Sunday, 13 December, with Division B scheduled in the morning session, at 11:54, and Division A scheduled in the afternoon session, at 15:47.

Division A

Division B

References

Women 0500
4